I Am Stamos is a 2004 American short film starring John Stamos and Robert Peters, directed by Rob Meltzer. The film world premiered on March 3, 2004 at the  US Comedy Arts Festival in Aspen, Colorado.

Synopsis
Andy Shrub (played by Peters) is a struggling actor who seems to be typecast as "the goofy best friend'" but wants to be a leading man. At a birthday party, he wishes that he looked like John Stamos before blowing out the candles on his cake. He suddenly understands that he always seems to be Stamos when he is captured on camera or in a video. He is then cast in a sitcom as John Stamos.

When John Stamos (playing himself), finds out about this, he angrily goes to the studio and argues with Andy and his producer Norman (played by E.E. Bell). The movie ends with the real John Stamos being killed.

Cast
Robert Peters as Andry Shrub
John Stamos as Himself
E.E. Bell as Norman
Jordana Capra as The Casting Director
Zena Leigh as The Casting Assistant
Chris Kennedy as J.P.

References

External links 
 

2004 short films
2004 films
American short films
2000s English-language films